Weightlifting at the Pacific Games has been contested since 1966 when it was included as one of twelve sports at the Second South Pacific Games held in Nouméa, New Caledonia. A weightlifting competition for women was introduced in 1995 for the games in Papeete.

In accordance with the International Weightlifting Federation (IWF) classifications, there are presently eight weight classes for the men's competition and seven for the women's competition at the Pacific Games (known as the South Pacific Games prior to 2009).

Weightlifting has also been included in many of the Pacific Mini Games, starting with the third edition held at Nuku'alofa in 1989.

Pacific Games
The weight classes contested at each Pacific Games for weightlifting are listed in the table below. The nationality of the gold medal winner for the combined total in each class is indicated by a flag icon and three letter country code, where this information is known; otherwise an (X) is used. Moving the cursor onto a country code with a dotted underline will reveal the name of the gold medal winner. A dash (–) indicates a weight division that was not contested.

Men's weightlifting

Women's weightlifting

Pacific Mini Games

Men's

Women's

See also
Weightlifting at the Commonwealth Games
Weightlifting at the Summer Olympics

Notes

References
  

 
Pacific Games
Pacific Games